Cherchez la femme is a French phrase which literally means 'look for the woman'.  It is a cliche in detective fiction, used to suggest that a mystery can be resolved by identifying a femme fatale or female love interest.

Origin of the phrase 
The expression comes from the novel The Mohicans of Paris (Les Mohicans de Paris) published 1854–1859 by Alexandre Dumas (père). The phrase is repeated several times in the novel; the first use reads:

Cherchez la femme, pardieu! cherchez la femme!
Look for the woman, by God! Look for the woman!

Dumas also used the phrase in his 1864 theatrical adaptation:

Il y a une femme dans toutes les affaires; aussitôt qu'on me fait un rapport, je dis: « Cherchez la femme ! »
There is a woman in every case; as soon as someone brings me a report, I say, 'Look for the woman!'

Significance 
The phrase embodies a cliché of detective pulp fiction: no matter what the problem, a woman is often the root cause.

The phrase has thus come to refer to explanations that automatically find the same root cause, no matter the specifics of the problem.

In his 1963 detective novel The Chill, Ross Macdonald's sleuth Lew Archer offers a wry analysis of the concept, stating: "When a woman is murdered, you ask her estranged husband where he was at the time. It's the corollary of cherchez la femme."

In the 1974 film Chinatown, Evelyn Mulwray, Faye Dunaway's character, attempts to suss out J. J. Gittes (Jack Nicholson's character) by murmuring "cherchez la femme" to him in bed, insinuating that a woman is why he left the LAPD.

A character (a mud turtle) in the comic strip Pogo is named "Churchill 'Churchy' LaFemme".

See also 
 Cui bono
 Follow the money

References

External links 
 

French words and phrases
Quotations from literature
1850s neologisms
Detective fiction
Alexandre Dumas